Bäckström and Backström are Swedish surnames, etymologically distinct from one another, and sometimes anglicized to Beckstrom or Backstrom. 

Bäckström means "creak stream". Backström means "downhill stream".

Notable people with the name include:

 Anders Bäckström (born 1960), Swedish ice hockey defenceman
 Daffin Backstrom (1916–1993), American football, basketball, and baseball player and coach
 Fia Backström (born 1970), Swedish artist
 Gustav Backström (born 1995), Swedish ice hockey defenceman
 Henry Backstrom (1897–1987), American politician
 Ina Bäckström (born 1987), Swedish video game developer
 Ingrid Backstrom (born 1978), American skier
 Joakim Bäckström (born 1978), Swedish golfer
 Lars Bäckström (born 1953), Swedish Left Party politician 
 Nicklas Bäckström (born 1987), Swedish ice hockey center
 Niklas Bäckström (born 1978), Finnish ice hockey goaltender
 Niklas Bäckström (fighter) (born 1989), Swedish mixed martial arts fighter
 Nils Bäckström (born 1986), Swedish ice hockey defenseman 
 Ralph Backstrom (1937–2021), Canadian ice hockey center
 Urban Bäckström (born 1954), Swedish economist

See also
 Backstrom (TV series), an American television series

Swedish-language surnames